The 2020 Challenge Tour was the 32nd season of the Challenge Tour, the official development tour to the European Tour. The tour started as the Satellite Tour with its first Order of Merit rankings in 1989 and was officially renamed as the Challenge Tour at the start of the 1990 season.

After beginning with three tournaments in South Africa co-sanctioned with the Sunshine Tour, the remainder of the season was severely impacted by the COVID-19 pandemic, with many tournaments being cancelled or postponed.

Schedule
The following table lists official events during the 2020 season.

Challenge Tour Rankings
The rankings were titled as the Road to Mallorca and were based on prize money won during the season, calculated using a points-based system. The top five players on the tour earned limited status to play on the 2021 European Tour.

See also
2020 European Tour

Notes

References

External links
Schedule on the European Tour's official site
Rankings on the European Tour's official site

2020
2020 in golf